Stenomicridae is a family of flies belonging to the order Diptera. Flies in this family are yellow in color and easily mistake for Cecidomyiidae. The family is found in Europe.

Genera
 Podocera Czerny, 1929

References

Opomyzoidea
Brachycera families